Attin Bhalla is an Indian actor. He made his debut in Om in the year 2003. The film was an action thriller. He is son of writer Bharat B.Bhalla.

Films
 Om (2003)
 Dhadkanein (2006)

References

External links
 

Living people
Indian male film actors
Male actors in Kannada cinema
Year of birth missing (living people)